The Priesthood Restoration Site, formally known as the Aaronic Priesthood Restoration Site, is a historic site located in Oakland Township, Susquehanna County, Pennsylvania, United States. Due to its historical significance to Mormonism, the site is owned and operated by the Church of Jesus Christ of Latter-day Saints (LDS Church). The site comprises property once owned, and lived on, by Joseph Smith and is the spot where Latter Day Saints believe the resurrected John the Baptist conferred the Aaronic priesthood upon Smith and Oliver Cowdery in 1829. In September 2015, the church dedicated the site, which includes a visitors' center and meetinghouse, monuments, and the reconstructed homes of Smith and the Hale family.

History

In December 1827, Smith and his wife, Emma, moved to the area, hoping to escape persecution experienced in Palmyra, New York. After arriving, the Smiths purchased  from Emma's father, Issac Hale. In Smith's day, the property was located in the Harmony Township of Susquehanna County; when the Oakland Township was incorporated in 1853, it included the land in question. Emma had been raised in Harmony, and many of her family members lived in the area. Her brother, Jesse Hale, had constructed a three-room frame home which the Smiths purchased and had moved onto their property.

While living in the home, the Smith's first child, Alvin, was born and died. Alvin is buried just east of the historic site in the McKune Cemetery. 

According to Mormon histories, a large portion of the Book of Mormon was translated by Smith while living in the home. According to Smith, the Aaronic priesthood was restored to him and Cowdery on May 15, 1829, somewhere in the woods near the home. After being given the priesthood by John the Baptist by the laying on of hands, the two men baptized each other in the nearby Susquehanna River. Following the baptisms, they ordained each other to the Aaronic priesthood.

The Smith family left the area and their home, moving to Fayette, New York, in August 1830. In 1919, the home lived in by the Smiths was destroyed by fire.

Property acquisition and developments
Due to the significance to its early history, the LDS Church purchased the original site and some surrounding property. Between 1947 and 1959, the church purchased the original property and six additional acres. In 1960, a monument was added to the site which commemorates the restoration of the priesthood. The monument includes a sculpture by artist Avard T. Fairbanks, depicting John the Baptist conferring the priesthood on Smith and Cowdery. In 2002, the church purchased 25 acres of land which had been heavily polluted by adjacent railroad activity. This purchase extended the church's holdings to the river. The most recent acquisition occurred in January 2011, which added  purchased from the Boughton family for $2.1 million.

In a letter dated April 15, 2011, the LDS Church announced to nearby members that the site would be restored. The restoration included reconstructing the homes lived in by the Smith and Hale families, along with farm out-buildings. A combination visitors' center and meetinghouse is constructed, along with a new monument. Pennsylvania Route 171, which splits the historic site in two was rerouted as part of the project. In August 2015, the church announced that with construction completed, the site would be opened to the public on August 29 and was dedicated by apostle Russell M. Nelson on September 19, 2015. Steven E. Snow, the church’s official Church Historian and Recorder from August 2012 until August 2019, is credited with the completion of the Priesthood Restoration Site.

See also

 List of historic sites of The Church of Jesus Christ of Latter-day Saints

References

External links
 
 Priesthood Restoration Site Official site 
 Interactive Map: Priesthood Restoration Site

Significant places in Mormonism
Latter Day Saint movement in Pennsylvania
Properties of the Church of Jesus Christ of Latter-day Saints
Tourist attractions in Susquehanna County, Pennsylvania
1829 in Christianity